Tunisia, participated at the 2003 All-Africa Games held in Abuja, Nigeria. She won 89 medals.

Medal summary
Tunisia won 89 medals and was ranked joint 5th in the medal table.

Medal table

See also
 Tunisia at the All-Africa Games

References

Nations at the 2003 All-Africa Games
2003
2003 in Tunisian sport